Pierre Blanchar (30 June 1892 – 21 November 1963) was a French actor. He appeared in more than 50 films between 1922 and 1961. Blanchar was married to actress Marthe Vinot, with whom he had a daughter, actress Dominique Blanchar. He played Napoleon in the 1938 British film A Royal Divorce alongside Ruth Chatterton as Josephine. He later appeared alongside Michèle Morgan in the 1946 film Pastoral Symphony.

Selected filmography

 The Gardens of Murcia (1923)
 The Thruster (1924)
 The Promised Land (1925)
 Le Joueur d'échecs (1927)
 The Farewell Waltz (1928)
 The Wedding March (1929)
 Captain Fracasse (1929)
 Les Croix de bois (1932)
 The Beautiful Sailor (1932)
 L'Atlantide (1932)
 The Devil in the Bottle (1935)
 The Volga Boatman (1936)
 Street of Shadows (1937)
 Culprit (1937)
 The Former Mattia Pascal (1937)
 Life Dances On (1937)
 The Man from Nowhere (1937)
 A Royal Divorce (1938)
 The Strange Monsieur Victor (1938)
 Night in December (1940)
 La Liberation de Paris (1944)
 Pastoral Symphony (1946)
 Patrie (1946)
 Le Bataillon du ciel (1947)
 After Love (1948)
 Doctor Laennec (1949) 
 The Cupid Club (1949)
 My Friend Sainfoin (1950)

References

Bibliography
 O'Brien, Scott. Ruth Chatterton, Actress, Aviator, Author. BearManor Media, 2013.
 Palmer, Tim &  Michael, Charlie. Directory of World Cinema: France. Intellect Books, 2013.

External links

1892 births
1963 deaths
French male film actors
French male silent film actors
Deaths from brain cancer in France
People from Skikda
Volpi Cup for Best Actor winners
20th-century French male actors
Pieds-Noirs